Květa Peschke and Rennae Stubbs were the reigning champions when the event was last played in 2008. Stubbs retired from the sport two weeks before this event.
As a result, Peschke plays with Katarina Srebotnik. They successfully defended their title by beating Liezel Huber and Nadia Petrova 7–5, 6–7(2), [10–8] in the final.

Seeds

Draw

Draw

References
 Main Draw

2011 WTA Tour
2011 in Qatari sport
2011 Qatar Ladies Open – Doubles